Darrell Charles Dess  (born July 11, 1935) is a former American football offensive lineman in the National Football League for the Pittsburgh Steelers, New York Giants, and the Washington Redskins.  

Dess was born in New Castle, Pennsylvania. He played college football at North Carolina State University where he was an All Conference guard and was drafted in the eleventh round of the 1958 NFL Draft by the Redskins.

References 

1935 births
People from New Castle, Pennsylvania
Living people
American football offensive linemen
Eastern Conference Pro Bowl players
NC State Wolfpack football players
New York Giants players
Pittsburgh Steelers players
Washington Redskins players
Players of American football from Pennsylvania